Thaer is a surname. Notable people with the surname include:

Albrecht Thaer (1752–1828), German agronomist
Albrecht von Thaer (1868–1957), Prussian general
Lewis Von Thaer (born  1961), American business executive

See also
Thayer (name)